The Type P1 ship is a United States Maritime Administration (MARAD) designation for World War II passenger ships. P1 was used in World War II, Korean War and Vietnam War. Two P1-S2-L2 ships were built for the Navy and used as attack transports (APA). Many P1 type ships were built on Type C3-class ship hulls.

Ships in class

 The P1-S2-L2 s were a series of two ships. The first American assault military transports. Made with an aft ramp for the launching of small landing craft or for the unloading of tanks. 
 , first in class
 

 The P1-S1-DR1 s were four ships constructed in 1948 that were rebuilt as passenger and cargo ships
  MC#1675 
  MC#1676
  MC#1677
  MC#1678

See also
 Victory ships
 Liberty ship
 Type C1 ship
 Type C2 ship
 Type C3 ship
 United States Merchant Marine Academy
 List of auxiliaries of the United States Navy

References